The 2005 Pan American Race Walking Cup was held in Lima, Perú on 7–8 May.  The track of the Cup runs in the Avenida Augusto Pérez Aranibar.

A detailed report was given by Eduardo Biscayart.
Complete results were published.

Medallists

Results

Men's 20 km

*: Started as a guest out of competition.

Team

Men's 50 km

*: Started as a guest out of competition.

Team

Men's 10 km (Junior)

*: Started as a guest out of competition.

Team

Women's 20 km

Team

Women's 10 km (Junior)

*: Started as a guest out of competition.

Team

Participation
The participation of 120 athletes from 16 countries is reported.

 (8)
 (7)
 (5)
 (8)
 (9)
 (2)
 (2)
 (15)
 (3)
 (5)
 México (14)
 Panamá (1)
 Perú (13)
 (7)
 (18)
 (3)

See also
 2005 Race Walking Year Ranking

References

Pan American Race Walking Cup
Pan American Race Walking Cup
Pan American Race Walking Cup
International athletics competitions hosted by Peru